Guillaume Boitel, was a knight and the faithful companion of the French knight Bertrand Du Guesclin. He was  originally sent by king Charles V of France to assist Du Guesclin  during the Anglo-French war in Normandy and the  Breton War of Succession between Charles de Blois and Jean de Montfort (1363-1364).

He followed Du Guesclin as his vanguard chief in Spain, helping Henry II of Castile against his half-brother Peter of Castile, with  Breton, French and English warlords such as Hugh Calveley. He conquered Magallón and Briviesca.

He was one of the French chiefs during the Battle of Montiel. In 1369, after the Spanish civil war, he returned to France some months before Du Guesclin, appointed as constable of France in March 1370, for new fights against the troops of king Edward III of England.

References 

 Chronique de Bertrand du Gueselin by Cuvelier, trouvère (minstrel), E. Charriere, 1839
 "Histoire de Bertrand du Guesclin, connestable de France et des royaumes de Léon, de Castille, de Cordoue et de Séville, duc de Molines, comte de Longueville", par messire Paul Hay, seigneur du Chastelet, édition à Paris, chez Jean Guignard 1666, conserved formerly in the imperial library of Vienna (Austria), page 70: feats (exploits) of Guillaume Boitel, siege and capture of Valognes , page 346: la montre (military parade) of Guillaume Boitel, p. 201: Chandos, constable of Aquitaine, killed by Guillaume Boitel: " According to the common opinion, Chandos was killed by Guillaume Boitel. Stabbed, he exclaimed that he was dead, and his brother,outraged by the pain caused by this accident, ordered to cut the head of all the Frenchmen, but Chandos did not want so..." (original text: "l'opinion commune est que Chandos fut tué par Guillaume Boitel. Il s'écria en recevant  le coup qu'il était mort, et son frère, outré de la douleur que cet accident lui causait, commanda que l'on coupast la teste à tous les François, mais Chandos ne le voulut pas...")

14th-century French people
Medieval French knights